Queen Anne Historic District is a national historic district located in Reading, Berks County, Pennsylvania.  The district encompasses 2,405 contributing buildings in Reading built between about 1880 and 1925.  The district consists primarily of semi-detached houses and rowhouses, with a few stone church buildings and small commercial buildings.  Most of the buildings are constructed of brick and reflective of Late Victorian and early 20th-century architectural styles. The churches are St. Mary's Episcopal Church (1904) and Wesley United Methodist Church (1922).  Located in the district and separately listed are the Charles S. Foos Elementary School and former Meinig Glove Factory-E. Richard Meinig Co.

It was listed on the National Register of Historic Places in 2004.

References

Historic districts on the National Register of Historic Places in Pennsylvania
Historic districts in Berks County, Pennsylvania
National Register of Historic Places in Reading, Pennsylvania